Crazy Quilt Mesa is a  elevation white Navajo Sandstone summit located in Zion National Park, in Kane County of southwest Utah, United States.

Description
Its nearest neighbor is Checkerboard Mesa, one-half mile immediately east, and separated by Checkerboard Mesa Canyon. This canyon holds pools of rainwater which provide a vital source of water for resident bighorn sheep. Other nearby peaks include Nippletop to the west, and Ant Hill to the northwest. Precipitation runoff from this mountain drains into tributaries of the Virgin River.

Climate
Spring and fall are the most favorable seasons to visit Crazy Quilt Mesa. According to the Köppen climate classification system, it is located in a Cold semi-arid climate zone, which is defined by the coldest month having an average mean temperature below , and at least 50% of the total annual precipitation being received during the spring and summer.

See also
 
 List of mountains of Utah
 Geology of the Zion and Kolob canyons area
 Colorado Plateau

Gallery

References

External links

 Zion National Park National Park Service
 Weather forecast: National Weather Service
 Crazy Quilt Mesa rock climbing: Mountainproject.com

Mountains of Utah
Zion National Park
Sandstone formations of the United States
Colorado Plateau
Landforms of Kane County, Utah
Mesas of Utah
North American 2000 m summits